The Matumbi Highlands or Matumbi Hills is a major highland of southern Tanzania, extending from southern Pwani Region to northern Kilwa District of Lindi Region. The Matumbi highlands are named after the peoples that were the original inhabitants of the area, the Matumbi people. The average elevation of the highlands is 442m. The highlands are located in Kibata, Kipatimu, Chumo, Kinjumbi and Mingumbi wards of Kilwa District. In Pwani Region the highlands are found in Mbwara and Chumbi wards. The highlands are the location of Nan'goma Cave system.

References

Mountains of Tanzania